Francesco "Ciccio" Parisi (6 September 1930 – 18 November 2016) was an Italian Christian Democracy politician.

Born in Caltagirone, graduated in business economics, between 1987 and 1996 Parisi served two terms as a senator and one term in the Chamber of Deputies. He also served as a regional and municipal councilor.

References

1930 births
2016 deaths
People from Caltagirone
Christian Democracy (Italy) politicians
Italian People's Party (1994) politicians
Senators of Legislature X of Italy
Senators of Legislature XI of Italy
Deputies of Legislature XII of Italy
Politicians from the Province of Catania